The 2015 All-Japan Rugby Football Championship (日本ラグビーフットボール選手権大会 Nihon Ragubi-Futtobo-ru Senshuken Taikai) took place from 8 February up to the final on 28 February.

Qualifying

Top League
The top four teams (Panasonic Wild Knights, Yamaha Júbilo, Toshiba Brave Lupus, Kobelco Steelers) in the 2014–15 Top League automatically qualified for the competition, and competed in a playoff competition.

Panasonic Wild Knights and Yamaha Júbilo eventually played in the Final, with Panasonic Wild Knights winning 30-12. As Top League finalists they gained automatic entry to the Championship Semi-finals.

The Top League Wildcard Tournament was contested by the fifth to twelfth teams in the final table for the last two places for this league in the Championship. These places were eventually taken by NEC Green Rockets and Suntory Sungoliath.

University 
In the 51st Japan National University Rugby Championship final Teikyo University defeated Tsukuba University 50-7. Both teams gained entry to the Championship as finalists, the two beaten semi-finalists Keio University and Tokai University also qualified.

Qualifying Teams 

 Top League Playoff Finalists - Panasonic Wild Knights, Yamaha Júbilo
 Top League Playoff Semi-Finalists - Toshiba Brave Lupus, Kobelco Steelers
 Top League Wild Card Playoff - Suntory Sungoliath, NEC Green Rockets
 All Japan University Rugby Championship - Teikyo University, Tsukuba University
 All Japan University Rugby Championship Semi-Finalists - Keio University, Tokai University

Knockout stages

First round

Quarter-final

Semi-final 

Panasonic Wild Knights and Yamaha Júbilo bypassed the first two rounds into the semi-finals by reaching the final of the Top League playoffs in 2015.

Final

See also 
 All-Japan Rugby Football Championship
 Rugby Union in Japan

References

2014–15 in Japanese rugby union
All-Japan Rugby Football Championship